Events from the year 1979 in Iran.

Incumbents
 Shah: Mohammad Reza Pahlavi (until February 11)
 Supreme Leader: Ruhollah Khomeini (starting December 3)
 Prime Minister: 
 until January 4: Gholam-Reza Azhari
 January 4 – February 11: Shapour Bakhtiar 
 February 11 – November 6: Mehdi Bazargan 
 starting November 6: Council of Islamic Revolution
 Chief Justice: Mohammad Beheshti (starting 3 June)

Events

 Iranian Revolution

See also
 Years in Iraq
 Years in Afghanistan

References

 
Iran
Years of the 20th century in Iran
1970s in Iran
Iran